Two-seater or two-seat may refer to:

 a vehicle with two seats, usually one for the driver and one for a passenger
 an aircraft with two seats, such as many trainers, fighters, gliders, and helicopters
 a coupé, an automobile with usually two seats 
 a coupé with a 2+2 style, with two normal size seats in the front and two smaller seats in the back intended to be used occasionally or for children
a microcar designed for urban use and space optimisation like the vehicles registered in the L7e category.
 a motorcycle designed to accommodate the rider/driver and another passenger rider
 a tandem bicycle
 a watercraft designed to accommodate two persons, such as a kayak with two cockpits
 an item of furniture with two seats, such as a loveseat
 a town with two seats, such as a lovetown